Tomás Félix Villanueva Rodríguez (25 February 1953 – 7 September 2017) was a Spanish politician. He was born in Valladolid and held several positions in the Junta of Castile and León. He was involved in various corruption scandals, and was set to appear before court in late 2017. However, on 7 September 2017, at the age of 64, Villanueva died suddenly of a heart attack.

References

1953 births
2017 deaths
People's Party (Spain) politicians
Government ministers of Castile and León
Members of the 4th Cortes of Castile and León
Members of the 5th Cortes of Castile and León
Members of the 6th Cortes of Castile and León
Members of the 7th Cortes of Castile and León
Members of the 8th Cortes of Castile and León
People from Valladolid